Chief of the Luftwaffe Personnel Office was not a rank but a leading position within the German Luftwaffe High Command in Nazi Germany.

List of chiefs

See also
Oberkommando der Luftwaffe
Inspector of Fighters
Inspector of Bombers
Army Personnel Office (Wehrmacht) (army equivalent)

References

Luftwaffe